This is a list of guest stars who have appeared on the Disney animated musical comedy television series, Phineas and Ferb. Per Academy of Television Arts & Sciences guidelines, individuals appearing in more than half of a given season's episodes will be considered "recurring" and will not be included on the list.

Season 1

Season 2

Season 3

Season 4

Films
The following appeared as guest stars in Phineas and Ferb the Movie: Across the 2nd Dimension.

The following appeared as guest stars in Phineas and Ferb the Movie: Candace Against the Universe.

See also
 List of Phineas and Ferb characters

References

External links
Phineas and Ferb at the Internet Movie Database

Guest Stars
Lists of characters in American television animation